Laxmi Barupal as an Indian politician and a leader of the Bharatiya Janata Party. She is a former Member of Legislative Assembly from Desuri constituency in Rajasthan. She is daughter of Hukam Ram Meghwal, former member of Parliament.

Education
Barupal is a Bachelor of Arts from Maharshi Dayanand University.

References

Bharatiya Janata Party politicians from Rajasthan
People from Pali district
Rajasthan MLAs 2003–2008
Women in Rajasthan politics
Year of birth missing (living people)
Living people
21st-century Indian women politicians